Bellator 255: Pitbull vs. Sanchez 2 was a mixed martial arts event produced by Bellator MMA that took place on April 2, 2021 at Mohegan Sun Arena in Uncasville, Connecticut. The event was Bellator's first of the year following a four-month break after Bellator 254.

Background 
This was the first Bellator event to air on Showtime, and the first MMA event to air on the network since the Strikeforce: Marquardt vs. Saffiedine event on January 12, 2013. The event streamed for free in the United States on Pluto TV and YouTube, in addition to Hulu, FuboTV, and participating cable television providers.

The event was headlined by the semi-final of the Bellator Featherweight World Grand Prix Tournament in a rematch between the current champion Patricio Freire and Emmanuel Sanchez. Freire won the last bout at Bellator 209 via unanimous decision.

A bantamweight bout between Jared Scoggins and Magomed Magomedov was scheduled to take place at this event. However, on March 18, Scoggins pulled out of the bout and was replaced by Cee Jay Hamilton.

Matt Mitrione was expected to face Tyrell Fortune at this event. However, during the week of the bout, Mitrione had to pull out and was replaced by Jack May.

Mads Burnell and The Ultimate Fighter: Team McGregor vs. Team Faber standout Saul Rogers was scheduled to fight at this event. However, the bout was cancelled due to visa issues. It eventually took place on April 16, 2021 at Bellator 257.

At weigh-ins, Aguiar missed weight by 1.7 pounds and Faraldo missed weight by .1 pounds. Both were fined a percentage of their purses. Mukhamed Berkhamov missed weight by 2.8 pounds, leading to the bout between him and Herman Terrado being pulled from the lineup due to Berkhamov’s miss.

Results

See also 

 2021 in Bellator MMA
 List of Bellator MMA events
 List of current Bellator fighters
 Bellator MMA Rankings

References 

Bellator MMA events
Events in Uncasville, Connecticut
2021 in mixed martial arts
April 2021 sports events in the United States
2021 in sports in Connecticut
Mixed martial arts in Connecticut
Sports competitions in Connecticut